Timothy Jurka is a Polish-American computer scientist and political scientist.

Background
Jurka is best known for developing the artificial intelligence that ranks the LinkedIn news feed. Previously, Jurka developed machine learning algorithms for news recommendations in the Pulse news reading application, which was acquired by LinkedIn in 2013.

As a Ph.D. student at UC Davis, Jurka collaborated on numerous projects in political science spanning media framing, civic engagement, and tobacco and immunization policy. Additionally, he wrote text classification software, including RTextTools and MaxEnt for the R statistical programming language.

He is the son of computational biologist Jerzy Jurka.

References

1988 births
Living people
Computer scientists
University of California, Davis alumni
People from Stanford, California
LinkedIn people